On March 23, 1971, the District of Columbia held a special election for its non-voting House delegate representing the District of Columbia's at-large congressional district. This was the first election for the newly re-created district since Norton P. Chipman briefly held the seat during the Reconstruction Era. The winner of the race was Walter E. Fauntroy, a Democrat.  After serving his remaining term in the 92nd United States Congress, he would continue to be re-elected until he stepped down to run for mayor in the 1990 election.

The non-voting delegate to the United States House of Representatives from the District of Columbia is elected for two-year terms, as are all other Representatives and Delegates minus the Resident Commissioner of Puerto Rico, who is elected to a four-year term.

Candidates 
Walter E. Fauntroy, a Democrat, sought election for his first term to the United States House of Representatives. Fauntroy was opposed in this election by Republican challenger John A. Nevius, who received 25.08%, and D.C. Statehood Party candidate Julius Hobson who received 13.23%.  This resulted in Fauntroy being elected with 58.44% of the vote.  This is the lowest percentage that a Democratic candidate has received in any election to the District of Columbia's at-large congressional district.

Results

References 

District of Columbia
District
at-large congressional
District of Columbia
1971
United States House of Representatives 1971